Prato Centenaro is a district (quartier) of Milan, Italy. It is an area located within Zone 9 of the city.

Districts of Milan
Former municipalities of Lombardy